The ASEAN Club Championship or ACC is an international club football competition organised by the ASEAN Football Federation between domestic champion clubs. The competition is backed by AFC and FIFA. The first edition was sponsored by LG Electronics, which was also known as LG Cup Asean Club Football Championship. Qualification to the competition was for champions clubs from AFF-affiliated countries only, plus the champions from India in 2003.

History
The ASEAN Club Championship was first held as biannual tournament in 2003 and 2005, but failed to gain traction due to lack of sponsors and conflict with the main calendar of the Asian Football Confederation. Plans to revive the tournament started as early as 2012.

The tournament was to return in 2020, but the tournament was postponed to 2021 due to the COVID-19 pandemic, but later postponed to 2022 and later cancelled.

Competition format
The format of the ASEAN Club Championship was the same as that for the AFC Cup, each national football associations in Southeast Asia sending their champion club representing the domestic league winners. The participating teams were split into groups of several teams (depending on the actual number of participating teams in each group), with each team playing the others in the group in a round-robin format. The winners and runners-up of each group advanced to quarter-finals or semi-finals, depending on the number of groups. These finals were played as a knockout competition in the host country.

Results

General performances

By club

By nation

All-time ranking table

All-time top scorers

See also
ASEAN Super League
AFC Champions League
AFC Cup
AFC President's Cup

References

External links
RSSSF.com: ASEAN Club Championship 2003
RSSSF.com: ASEAN Club Championship 2005
AFC (Asia) Official Web Site
AFF (ASEAN) Official Web Site
S-LeagueFootball.Blogspot.Com website

 
International club association football competitions in Asia
AFF competitions
Recurring sporting events established in 2003
Recurring sporting events disestablished in 2005